Calverton Miners' Welfare Football Club is an association football club in Calverton, near Nottingham, Nottinghamshire, England.

History
Calverton Miners Welfare was formed shortly after the end of the Second World War and after playing a few friendly matches they joined division two of the Nottingham Spartan League at the start of the 1947-48 season. Six years later the club joined the Nottingham & District League and then the Nottinghamshire Senior League before transferring to the Central Alliance for the 1964-65 season. However, after just one season the club decided to move to the Nottinghamshire Combination League and remained there until 1988. In 1997 the club returned to the Nottinghamshire Football Alliance and gained promotion from Division 2 at their third attempt and by the 2002-03 season they were in that league's top division. Two seasons later the club became founder members of the Nottinghamshire Senior League and following ground improvements the club joined the Central Midlands League in 2006 and that season competed in the FA Vase. Two seasons later the club was promoted to the Supreme Division and when the league was re-organised in 2011 they were placed in the South Division.

Honours
Central Midlands League Premier Division
Runners-up 2007–08
Nottinghamshire Senior League Division One
Champions 2016-17
Nottinghamshire Football Alliance Division Two
Runners-up 1999–2000

Records
FA Vase
First Round 2006–07, 2007–08

References

External links

Football clubs in England
Football clubs in Nottinghamshire
Central Midlands Football League
Nottinghamshire Senior League
Mining association football teams in England
Calverton, Nottinghamshire